In mathematics, the set of positive real numbers,  is the subset of those real numbers that are greater than zero. The non-negative real numbers,  also include zero.

In a complex plane,  is identified with the positive real axis, and is usually drawn as a horizontal ray. This ray is used as reference in the polar form of a complex number. The real positive axis corresponds to complex numbers  with argument

Properties
The set  is closed under addition, multiplication, and division. It inherits a topology from the real line and, thus, has the structure of a multiplicative topological group or of an additive topological semigroup.

For a given positive real number  the sequence  of its integral powers has three different fates: When  the limit is zero; when  the sequence is constant; and when  the sequence is unbounded.

 and the multiplicative inverse function exchanges the intervals. The functions floor,  and excess,  have been used to describe an element  as a continued fraction  which is a sequence of integers obtained from the floor function after the excess has been reciprocated.

The ordered set  forms a total order but is  a well-ordered set. In the study of physical magnitudes, the order of decades  provides positive and  negative ordinals referring to an ordinal scale implicit in the ratio scale.

In the study of classical groups, for every  the determinant gives a map from  matrices over the reals to the real numbers:  Restricting to invertible matrices gives a map from the general linear group to non-zero real numbers:  Restricting to matrices with a positive determinant gives the map ; interpreting the image as a quotient group by the normal subgroup  called the special linear group,  expresses the positive reals as a Lie group.

Ratio scale
Among the levels of measurement the ratio scale provides the finest detail. The division function  takes a value of one when numerator and denominator are  equal. Other ratios are compared to one by logarithms, often common logarithm using base 10. The ratio scale then segments by orders of magnitude used in science and technology, expressed in various units of measurement.

An early expression of ratio scale was articulated geometrically by Eudoxus: "it was ... in geometrical language that the general theory of proportion of Eudoxus was developed, which is equivalent to a theory of positive real  numbers."

Logarithmic measure
If  is an interval, then  determines a measure on certain subsets of  corresponding to the pullback of the usual Lebesgue measure on the real numbers under the logarithm: it is the length on the logarithmic scale. In fact, it is an invariant measure with respect to multiplication  by a  just as the Lebesgue measure is invariant under addition. In the context of topological groups, this measure is an example of a Haar measure.

The utility of this measure is shown in its use for describing stellar magnitudes and noise levels in decibels, among other applications of the logarithmic scale. For purposes of international standards ISO 80000-3, the dimensionless quantities are referred to as levels.

Applications
The non-negative reals serve as the image for metrics, norms, and measures in mathematics.

Including 0, the set  has a semiring structure (0 being the additive identity), known as the probability semiring; taking logarithms (with a choice of base giving a logarithmic unit) gives an isomorphism with the log semiring (with 0 corresponding to ), and its units (the finite numbers, excluding ) correspond to the positive real numbers.

Square
Let  the first quadrant of the Cartesian plane. The quadrant itself is divided into four parts by the line  and the standard hyperbola 

The  forms a trident while  is the central point. It is the identity element of two one-parameter groups that intersect there:

Since  is a group,  is a direct product of groups.

The realms of business and science abound in ratios, and any change in ratios draws attention. The study refers to hyperbolic coordinates in Q. Motion against the L axis indicates a change in the geometric mean  while a change along H indicates a new hyperbolic angle.

See also

References

Bibliography 

 

Topological groups
Measure theory